Claes Urban Källén (born 12 May 1943) is a Swedish curler.

In 1971 he was inducted into the Swedish Curling Hall of Fame.

Teams

Personal life
Claes' older brother Christer was also a curler and his teammate.

References

External links
 
Jättebragden i Kanada största ögonblicket för 60-årsfirande Djursholms CK
Svensk Curling nr 2-3 2013 by Svenska Curlingförbundet - issuu

Living people
1943 births
Swedish male curlers
Swedish curling champions